World Victory Road Presents: Sengoku 6 was a mixed martial arts event promoted by World Victory Road. The event took place on November 1, 2008 at the Saitama Super Arena in Saitama City, Japan. It featured the semi-final and final matches of the organization's Lightweight-  and Middleweight Grand Prix tournaments, allowing each tournament winner the opportunity to fight for the promotions championship.

Results

Tournament brackets

Lightweight Grand Prix Tournament

Lightweight Grand Prix Reserve Bouts:
 Jorge Masvidal def.  Ryan Schultz at Sengoku 5
 Jorge Masvidal def.  Seung Hwan Bang at Sengoku 6

Middleweight Grand Prix Tournament

Middleweight Grand Prix Reserve Bouts:
 Joe Doerksen def.  Izuru Takeuchi at Sengoku 6

See also 
 World Victory Road
 List of Sengoku champions
 2008 in World Victory Road

References

External links
 Sengoku official website

World Victory Road events
2008 in mixed martial arts
Mixed martial arts in Japan
Sport in Saitama (city)
2008 in Japanese sport